Valeriy Alexandrovich Pronkin (born 15 June 1994) is a Russian hammer thrower. His personal best is 79.32 metres, achieved in July 2017 in Zhukovskiy. He won the silver medal at the 2017 World Championships competing as a neutral athlete.

International competitions

References 

1994 births
Living people
Sportspeople from Nizhny Novgorod
Russian male hammer throwers
Olympic male hammer throwers
Olympic athletes of Russia
Authorised Neutral Athletes at the World Athletics Championships
World Athletics Championships medalists
European Athletics Championships medalists
Russian Athletics Championships winners
Athletes (track and field) at the 2020 Summer Olympics